Marek Yanai (born 1946) is an Israeli figurative painter and senior lecturer at Bezalel Academy of Art and Design, Jerusalem. He paints in watercolor and oil. His work as a painter and a teacher has contributed greatly to the establishing and development of figurative expression in art, design and animation in Israel.

Biography 
Marek Yanai was born in Germany in 1946 and immigrated to Israel from Poland in 1957.

He graduated from the Bezalel Academy of Arts and Design, Jerusalem in 1970, student of Yosef Hirsch (he).

In 1969 he founded the “Teddy” Puppet Theater, and was its director until 1971.

In 1973 and 1974 he studied techniques of the Old Masters in the Kunsthistorisches Museum in Vienna and the San Fernando Royal Academy of Fine Art, Madrid.

From 1996 until today he is a senior lecturer at the Bezalel Academy of Art and Design, Jerusalem and also teaches in his own studio.

Yanai lives and works in Jerusalem.

Body of work 
Yanai's works are figurative and strive to interpret reality. His subjects are the Jerusalem landscape and people. His portraits in watercolor depict friends, students, lecturers and other people in his life. This series is renowned for his work with patches of color and his ability to reveal the character of the subjects with the use of these marks and strong tones. The series of landscapes deal with, on the face of it, rather banal and mundane subjects such as solar panels on roofs, gas tanks and washing hanging out to dry. Through their banality, these scenes reflect the complexity of the city's soul. Yanai's creativity offers a picture of the spirit of the times in his vicinity. He is known for his use of light to produce shape and life.

The art researcher Gideon Efrat (he) wrote of Yanai :"(His works contain) metaphorical lights. Pressing them into an interior and surrounding them with shadows to symbolize the inner soul; while the victory of the bright and color-bleaching white in the outdoor landscapes represents the "I-world" relationship. The essence of the soul is darkness. The all-consuming whiteness is the essence of emergence into the world. Loss lies in wait in both extremes: sinking in the darkness of the self, or annihilating the body in the searing light outside. Marek Yanai endures in his paintings. Again and again he sallies out in the world to create it anew out of light".

Watercolor 
Yanai has created a virtuosic body of work in watercolor. It is characterized by instinctive production of wet marks that permit random in the dispersal of the water. The making of the marks create a figurative image. The artist Sasha Okun: "Painting with watercolors creates an infinite number of surprises and unexpected situations. Yanai is gifted with the exceptional ability to control the unexpected, which is considered the ultimate ability by the Japanese, the greatest of watercolor artists."

Oil painting 
Yanai's oil painting differs greatly from his work in watercolor in technique, style and temperament. His oil painting is realistic and built up over time, layer upon layer, as was the technique of 17th and 18th century European painters. Predominant themes in his work are entrances to, and interiors of, Jerusalem houses, and Jerusalem figures and landscapes.

Teaching 
From 1996 until the present, he is a senior lecturer at the Bezalel Academy of Art and Design Jerusalem, and also teaches in his studio. He has had a great influence on generations of artists in the painting, design and animation fields.

The principle of the studio's activities is painting from observation. The studio is characterized by a great respect for the craftsmanship in painting: drawing as a basis for painting, line and mark, composition, color theory, and faithfulness to the unwritten laws passed down through the centuries that are the foundations of art. Craftsmanship is repeatedly exercised as a value leading to personal interpretation and creative self-expression in a variety of media: drawing, oil and watercolor. Work takes place both in the studio space and, ‘en plein air’ in the Jerusalem landscape. The studio promotes working as a group to induce mutual learning and fertile creativity, while encouraging personal choice in artistic expression.

Gallery

Awards 

2003     Mordechai Ish Shalom prize for a special contribution to art 
1997 Shoshana Ish Shalom prize for artistic creation
1967 Fenniger prize for young artists

Artist's books
2016     Marek Yanai, watercolor
2004     Marek Yanai, Mayanot Gallery

Solo exhibitions
2022       Marek Yanai: On the Threshold (Curator: Amichai Chasson), Beit Avi Chai, Jerusalem
2016       Present: Portraits of People and Trees, Jerusalem Artists House
2015       Marek Yanai, Hacubia, Jerusalem 
2014       Jerusalem double perspective, Matsart Gallery, Jerusalem 
2014       Video screenings of watercolor portraits demos, Bezalel Academy of Art and Design Jerusalem
2004       Portraits, Jerusalem Artists House 
2004       Recent works, Mayanot Gallery, Jerusalem 
1997       Heads in watercolor, Jerusalem Artists House
1994 Carol Schwartz Gallery, Philadelphia
1993       Mayanot Gallery, Jerusalem
1991       Jerusalem Artists House
1990 S.D. Gallery, Lodz, Poland
1989 Carol Schwartz Gallery, Philadelphia
1988       Mayanot Gallery, Jerusalem
1987 Shdema Gallery, Tel Aviv
1984 Ella Gallery, Jerusalem
1983 Profile Gallery, New York
1982 VII Gallery, Boca Raton, Florida
1982 Engel Gallery, New York
1979       Jerusalem Artists House

Illustration of books and magazines 
Yanai has collaborated with artists in diverse fields and has contributed illustrations to important publications throughout the world. 
 Book cover and illustrations: Another Journey with a Raven and Saint Claire by Hava Pinhas-Cohen
 Paintings for the feature film Nuzhat directed by Judd Ne'eman with the actor Mohammad Bakhri in the role of the artist
 Book cover: The Book in the Jewish World,1700–1900 by Zeev Gries (he)
 Book cover: The Book as Culture Agent (Hebrew) by Zeev Gries (he)
 Articles, demonstrations and covers: “Einayim” Magazine
 Book cover: Divorced by Tuvia Mendelson
 Covers and illustrations: Davar weekly
 Illustrations: Monitin magazine (he)
 Cover: Moment, American magazine

References

External links 

Living people
Israeli watercolourists
Academic staff of Bezalel Academy of Arts and Design
Israeli painters
1946 births